Alexander Michlmayr (born 11 April 2003) is an Austrian footballer who plays as a forward for Juniors OÖ.

Club career
On 7 February 2022, Michlmayr signed with Austrian Football Bundesliga club LASK. As LASK and Sulzner's previous club Juniors OÖ are under a cooperation agreement, he is eligible to play for either club.

Career statistics

Club

Notes

References

2003 births
People from Steyr
Footballers from Upper Austria
Living people
Austrian footballers
Austria youth international footballers
Association football forwards
2. Liga (Austria) players
Austrian Football Bundesliga players
LASK players
FC Juniors OÖ players